Sturecompagniet is one of Sweden's biggest and most known nightclubs and is located at the old Sturebadets 1800-locals at Sturegatan 4 at Stureplan in Stockholm. Close to Sturecompagniet lies nightclubs Hell's Kitchen and IV. Sturecompagniet was in 1994 the scene of the notorious mass murder perpetrated by Tommy Zethraeus.

References 

Nightclubs in Sweden